Mesmerised is an Australian television series involving hypnotist Peter Powers traveling around Australia with actors and volunteers willing to be hypnotised by Powers and made to perform amusing and often embarrassing acts. The series was produced for the Seven Network by Endemol Australia.

The series premiered in Australia on 15 October 2015 on the Seven Network. Although six episodes were produced, the program was pulled from the broadcast schedule after low ratings for its debut episode. The Seven Network planned to air the remaining episodes weekly on 7flix on Sunday afternoons at 5:00pm.

Episodes

Season 1 (2015)

References

2015 Australian television series debuts
Television series canceled after one episode
English-language television shows
Australian comedy television series
Hypnosis
Seven Network original programming